Raghubir Singh is a notable equestrian of India. He was awarded the Arjuna Award in 1982 for his achievements. He was also awarded the Padma Shri in 1983. He represented India in the Asian Games in 1982 and won a gold medal in the individual event. He hails from Jhunjhunu district in Rajasthan state in India. He served as a Dafadar in the Indian army.

He is a native of Patoda village in Jhunjhunu district of Rajasthan.

External links 
 Sportal page
 Doha 2006 - Past Medals

Indian male equestrians
Indian dressage riders
Equestrians from Rajasthan
Recipients of the Arjuna Award
Recipients of the Padma Shri in sports
Rajasthani people
Living people
Asian Games gold medalists for India
People from Jhunjhunu district
Military personnel from Rajasthan
Asian Games medalists in equestrian
Equestrians at the 1982 Asian Games
Equestrians at the 1986 Asian Games
Equestrians at the 1994 Asian Games
Asian Games bronze medalists for India
Medalists at the 1982 Asian Games
Medalists at the 1986 Asian Games
Year of birth missing (living people)